The  is a Japanese family-owned publishing vertical keiretsu in Hitotsubashi, Chiyoda, Tokyo. It is composed of Shogakukan, Shueisha, Hakusensha and related publishing companies. The name of the group is derived from the location of its major members' headquarters in the Hitotsubashi area of Tokyo. The group companies are mostly run by the Ōga family, whose influence in the companies is still strong today.

It was started when Shogakukan, which was focused mainly on educational magazines and other related publishing at the time, decided to spin off a company (Shueisha) to produce entertainment magazines. Eventually, Shogakukan moved into the entertainment business as well, and became a rival of Shueisha, and the group was formed to help each one grow. The headquarters buildings for Shogakukan and Shueisha are right next to each other.

Associated companies
Hakusensha
President
Shodensha
Shogaku Tosho
Shogakukan
Shogakukan-Shueisha Productions (ShoPro)
Shorinsha
Shotsu
Showa Tosho
Shueisha
Viz Media
Viz Productions
VME PLB SAS

References
 
 
 

Entertainment companies of Japan
Publishing companies of Japan
Keiretsu
Conglomerate companies based in Tokyo